Murray Baker (born 21 April 1946) is a New Zealand thoroughbred racehorse trainer and former New Zealand cricketer.

Cricket
Baker played in one List A and seventeen first-class matches for Central Districts and Northern Districts from 1966 to 1975. Baker was part of the team who won the Plunket Shield and played for Huddersfield in England.

Horse training
Baker started training at Woodville in the 1970s. His first raceday winner was Vizier on October 4 1978, at Otaki. Another early winner was Sir Vigilant in the 1985 New Zealand St. Leger. In 2000 Murray moved his training operation to Cambridge.

He has trained in partnership with:
 his son, Bjorn Baker, who later moved to set up stables of his own at Warwick Farm Racecourse in Sydney, Australia.
 Andrew Forsman.

Murray has won many major races on both sides of the Tasman with leading horses such as:

 Bonneval, twice New Zealand Horse of the Year, winner of the 2017 Australian Oaks, Feehan Stakes, New Zealand Oaks and Underwood Stakes
 Dal Cielo, winner of the 2015 Ellerslie Sires Produce Stakes 
 Dundeel, winner of the Australian Triple Crown of Thoroughbred Racing
 Harris Tweed, winner of the 2009 Tulloch Stakes and 2010 The Bart Cummings, placed 2nd in the 2009 AJC Derby and 2010 Caulfield Cup
 Jon Snow, winner of the 2017 Australian Derby
 Lickety Split, winner of the 2022 Sistema Stakes
 Lion Tamer, winner of the 2010 Victoria Derby.
 Lizzie L’Amour, winner of the 2018 Herbie Dyke Stakes
 Mongolian Khan, winner of the 2015 New Zealand Derby, AJC Derby and Caulfield Cup
 My Eagle Eye, winner of the 1992 Sydney Cup
 Nom Du Jeu, winner of the 2008 AJC Derby
 Quick Thinker, winner of the 2019 Ming Dynasty Quality Handicap, 2020 Australian Derby & Tulloch Stakes and 2021 Chairman's Handicap (ATC)
 Stolen Dance, winner of the 2018 Thorndon Mile
 The Phantom,winner of the 1990 Memsie Stakes and Underwood Stakes.  Placed 3rd in the 1989 Caulfield Cup and 2nd in the 1990 Melbourne Cup
 The Chosen One, winner of the 2022 Thorndon Mile
 Turn Me Loose, winner of the 2014 New Zealand 2000 Guineas, 2015 Crystal Mile, Seymour Cup, Emirates Stakes and 2016 Futurity Stakes (MRC)
 Vin De Dance, winner of the 2018 New Zealand Derby

Murray retired from training in May 2022. During his career he had accumulated:
 over 1800 New Zealand winners.
 approximately 60 winners in Australia.
 270 stakes and group race wins (including 48 in Australia).
 57 Group One wins (including 22 in Australia).
 9 Derbies and 5 Oaks victories.
 4 New Zealand training premierships.
 5 New Zealand trainer of the year awards.

Murray is a member of the New Zealand Racing Hall of Fame.

See also
 Opie Bosson
 Roger James
 Lance O'Sullivan
 Jamie Richards
 Chris Waller
 Thoroughbred racing in New Zealand

References

External links
 
 Baker Racing - Cambridge New Zealand
 Decorated trainer was born to be wildly successful
 MURRAY BAKER INDUCTED INTO THE NEW ZEALAND RACING HALL OF FAME
 People A-G | NZ Racing Hall of Fame

1946 births
Living people
New Zealand cricketers
Central Districts cricketers
Northern Districts cricketers
Cricketers from Napier, New Zealand
New Zealand racehorse trainers
New Zealand Racing Hall of Fame inductees